Pete Rostosky (born July 29, 1961) was a professional football offensive tackle for the NFL's Pittsburgh Steelers from 1984 through 1986.  Rostosky attended the University of Connecticut, graduating in 1983.  During his professional career he played in 35 games, starting eight.  He was part of the team that advanced to the 1984 AFC Championship Game versus the Miami Dolphins.  He returned one kickoff for three yards in 1986.  He wore uniform number 63.  He currently resides in Canonsburg, Pennsylvania.

References

Living people
1961 births
Pittsburgh Steelers players
Players of American football from Pennsylvania
UConn Huskies football players
People from Canonsburg, Pennsylvania
Ed Block Courage Award recipients